This is a list of Permanent Under-Secretaries in the British Foreign, Commonwealth and Development Office (and its predecessors) since 1790.

Not to be confused with Parliamentary Under-Secretary of State for Foreign Affairs.

Permanent Under-Secretaries at the Foreign Office, 1790 to present 

These are the Permanent Secretaries or senior civil servants at the Foreign Office.

February 1790: George Aust
October 1795: George Hammond (resigned 1806)
March 1807: George Hammond
October 1809: William Richard Hamilton
July 1817: Joseph Planta
April 1827: John Backhouse
1842: Henry Unwin Addington
1854: Edmund Hammond (later Lord Hammond)
1873: Lord Tenterden
1882: Sir Julian Pauncefote (later Lord Pauncefote)
1889: Sir Philip Currie (later Lord Currie)
1894: Sir Thomas Sanderson (later Lord Sanderson)
1906: Sir Charles Hardinge (later Lord Hardinge of Penshurst)
1910: Sir Arthur Nicolson (later Lord Carnock)
1916: Lord Hardinge of Penshurst
1920: Sir Eyre Crowe (died in office)
1925: Sir William Tyrrell (later Lord Tyrrell)
1928: Sir Ronald Lindsay
1930: Sir Robert Vansittart (later Lord Vansittart)
1938: Sir Alexander Cadogan
1946: Sir Orme Sargent (jointly with Sir William Strang, Head of the German Section 1947–1949)
1949: Sir William Strang (jointly with the Heads of the German Section: Sir Ivone Kirkpatrick 1949–1950, Sir D. Gainer 1950–1951) (later Lord Strang)
1953: Sir Ivone Kirkpatrick
1957: Sir Frederick Hoyer Millar (later Lord Inchyra)
1962: Sir Harold Caccia (later Lord Caccia)
1965: Sir Paul Gore-Booth (also Head of the Diplomatic Service from 1968; later Lord Gore-Booth)
1969: Sir Denis Greenhill (later Lord Greenhill of Harrow)
1973: Sir Thomas Brimelow (later Lord Brimelow)
1975: Sir Michael Palliser
1982: Sir Antony Acland
1986: Sir Patrick Wright (later Lord Wright of Richmond)
1991: Sir David Gillmore (later Lord Gillmore of Thamesfield)
1994: Sir John Coles
1997: Sir John Kerr (later Lord Kerr of Kinlochard)
2002: Sir Michael Jay (later Lord Jay of Ewelme)
2006: Sir Peter Ricketts (later Lord Ricketts)
2010: Sir Simon Fraser
2015: Sir Simon McDonald (later Lord McDonald of Salford)
2020: Sir Philip Barton

See also 

 List of permanent under secretaries of state of the Home Office
Undersecretary

Foreign Affairs, Permanent Under-Secreatary of State
Foreign, Commonwealth and Development Office
1790 establishments in Great Britain